Mohammad Reza Adelkhani (born February 13, 1947, in Tehran, Iran) is a retired Iranian footballer and former Iran national football team player.

Adelkhani achieved the UEFA Pro Licence, the first Iranian to do so.

Early life 
He was born on 13 February 1947 in Tehran, Iran. He began playing in football in 1960 playing at Shahin.

Club career 
Adelkhani played for SG Wattenscheid 09, Wuppertaler SV, Rot-Weiß Oberhausen and VfL Klafeld-Geisweid before moving back to Iran. He was the first Iranian player to move to Europe to play football. When he was in Turkey with Taj SC for a friendly match, German talent scouts saw his performance and signed him for Bayern Munchen.

Adelkhani's first senior club in Iran was Taj SC with whom he reached champion title in the Iranian league in Takht Jamshid Cup. He then joined Shahbaz F.C., where he reached third place in the Iranian league in 1976/77.

International career 
Between 1973 and 1978, he played 17 times for the national team and scored 2 goals.

Iranian football fans will never forget the Asian football Olympic final 1974 in Aryamehr Stadium between Iran and Israel, in which Adelkhani forced Shum's own goal, which led Iran to win this tournament.

He was part of the Iran squad that qualified for the 1978 FIFA World Cup. However, an injury he sustained while saving his young daughter from falling down the stairs kept him out of the competition.

He was a left-footed player.

References 

1947 births
Living people
Iranian footballers
Iran international footballers
Association football forwards
FC Bayern Munich II players
Rot-Weiß Oberhausen players
Wuppertaler SV players
Bonner SC players
SG Wattenscheid 09 players
Esteghlal F.C. players
Shahin FC players
Oberliga (football) players
Regionalliga players
Iranian expatriate footballers
Expatriate footballers in Germany
Iranian expatriate sportspeople in Germany
Sportspeople from Tehran
Asian Games gold medalists for Iran
Medalists at the 1974 Asian Games
Asian Games medalists in football
Footballers at the 1974 Asian Games